Tara i tokerau ("point of north") is an islet in Palmerston Island in the Cook Islands. The islet is on the north tip of the atoll, between North Island and Marions bank.

References

Palmerston Island